Youssef Abdelke (born 1951) is a Syrian visual artist, he works in drawing, and printmaking. He is one of Syria’s leading artists, and the husband of Syrian filmmaker Hala Al-Abdallah Yacoub.

Biography 
Abdelke attended Damascus University, and graduated in 1976. He was a political prisoner for two years before being forced into exile to France the late 1970s. He graduated from the École Nationale Superieure des Beaux Arts; and from Paris XIII with a PhD in Fine Arts.

Abdelke’s artworks can be found in museums, including the British Museum, Institut du Monde Arabe in Paris, the Amman Museum of Modern Art, and the National Museum of Kuwait.

On July 19, 2013, the Syrian government forces arrested him after he signed a declaration calling for the departure of President Bashar al-Assad.

See also 
 List of Syrian artists

References

External links 
 https://www.facebook.com/youssef.abdelke.artist

1951 births
Living people
Syrian male artists
Syrian contemporary artists
Printmakers